Semeteš (Serbian Cyrillic: Семетеш) is a town in Serbia. It is part of the municipality and district of Raška in south-western Serbia.

Population
The population of Mijatovak was 152 in 2002. Below is a list of historical population, based on the Serb census.
 1948: 332
 1953: 352
 1961: 378
 1971: 352
 1981: 304
 1991: 231
 2002: 152

Ethnic composition
All 152 inhabitants of Semeteš are Serbian in ethnicity.
.

References

Populated places in Raška District